Muktijuddho Sriti Stadium is a former international stadium located at Rajshahi, Bangladesh. It is also known as Rajshahi District Stadium.  The venue currently hosts domestic football matches.

There are 3 multi-purpose sporting venue in the Rajshahi district. Rajshahi Divisional stadium and Rajshahi University Stadium being others
This is the 2nd important sporting venue of Rajshahi district after Shaheed Quamruzzaman 
Stadium.

International matches
Last international football match played here was in 2015 between Bangladesh and Sri Lanka.
Bangladesh won that match by 3–0.

See also
Stadiums in Bangladesh
List of football stadiums in Bangladesh

References

Cricket grounds in Bangladesh
Football venues in Bangladesh
Rajshahi

External links